José Andrés Ramírez Hernández (born 19 March 1996) is a Mexican professional footballer who plays as a defender for Tapatío.

References

External links
 
 

1996 births
Living people
Mexican footballers
Association football defenders
C.D. Guadalajara footballers
Club Atlético Zacatepec players
Leones Negros UdeG footballers
Ascenso MX players
Liga Premier de México players
Tercera División de México players
Footballers from Guadalajara, Jalisco